Lindsey Marcie Harding (born June 12, 1984) is an American professional basketball coach and former player. She serves as player development coach of the Sacramento Kings. Throughout her playing career, Harding played for the Minnesota Lynx, Washington Mystics, Atlanta Dream, Los Angeles Sparks, New York Liberty and Phoenix Mercury of the Women's National Basketball Association (WNBA) and has played overseas in Turkey and Russia. She was previously a scout and a player development coach for the Philadelphia 76ers. She was born in Mobile, Alabama, but grew up in Houston, Texas and also holds a Belarusian passport.

College career
Harding had a standout career at Duke University. As a freshman in 2002–2003 she was named to the All-ACC Freshman Team, averaging 6.2 points, 3.9 rebounds, 3.4 assists, 1.8 steals and had an ACC-best 2.1 assist/turnover ratio. As a sophomore in 2003–04 she averaged 7.3 points, 4.5 rebounds, 4.9 assists, 2.0 steals and had an ACC-best 2.2 assist/turnover ratio.

Harding was redshirted for the 2004–05 season because of violation of team rules. She returned as a junior for 2005–2006 and was an Honorable Mention Kodak and Associated Press All-America, ACC Defensive Player of the Year. She averaged 10.7 points, 4.5 assists, 3.7 rebounds and 2.1 steals as a junior.

Harding finished her college career with 1,298 points, 25 blocks, 579 assists, 296 steals and 565 rebounds in 128 games (school record).  She was only the sixth player in ACC history to register 1,000 points, 500 assists, 500 rebounds and 250 steals.

Despite her tremendous career numbers, contributions and a 32–2 record, she left Duke without winning an NCAA championship.  Harding's senior season at Duke ended with the Rutgers Scarlet Knights' upset of the Blue Devils in the Sweet Sixteen round of the NCAA tournament, a one-point upset sealed by Harding's missing two free throws with 0.1 seconds remaining in the game.

Following her senior season, Harding entered the 2007 WNBA draft.

On January 20, 2008, Harding was honored by having her jersey number (10) retired, becoming only the second Duke women's basketball player after former teammate Alana Beard to be bestowed that honor. Some have questioned whether Duke should have bestowed such an honor, given the undisclosed reasons behind her redshirt year. In addition, on December 18, 2007, her jersey No. 12 was retired by Cy-Fair High School.

College statistics

Awards
 2003 ACC All-Rookie team
 2006 Duke Classic MVP
 2006, 2007 ACC Defensive Player of the Year
 2007 Naismith National Player of the Year
 2007 WBCA National Defensive Player
 2007 ESPN.com National Player of the Year
 2007 Nancy Lieberman Award
 2007 Frances Pomeroy Naismith Award
 2007 USBWA All-American
 2007 John R. Wooden Award All-American
 2007 Associated Press First Team All-American
 2007 ACC Player of the Year
 2007 All ACC First Team
 2007 Duke Offensive Player of the Year
 2007 Duke Practice Player of the Year
 2007 Duke Heart and Hustle Award

WNBA career
Harding was drafted first overall in the 2007 WNBA Draft by the Phoenix Mercury and was traded to the Minnesota Lynx for forward Tangela Smith the same day.

During the 2007 season, Harding was leading all rookies in scoring before a knee injury ended her season on July 10. She was named to the WNBA All-Rookie Team by the end of the season and finished with averages of 11.7 points and 3.9 assists per game.

On January 30, 2009, Harding was traded to the Washington Mystics for the first and second round picks in the 2009 WNBA draft. She had a stellar season with the Mystics, averaging a career-high 12.8 points and 4.6 assists per game. In her second season with the Mystics, Harding scored a career-high 33 points against the Indiana Fever.

On April 11, 2011, Harding was traded to the Atlanta Dream along with the 2012 2nd round draft pick in exchange for Ta'Shia Phillips, Kelly Miller, and the Dream's 2012 1st round draft pick. In her first season with the Dream, Harding was the starting point guard on the team's roster. Along with Izi Castro Marques, Érika de Souza, Sancho Lyttle and Angel McCoughtry, the Dream were a championship contender in the league. Harding experienced her first WNBA Finals appearance with the team as they had advanced all the way to the WNBA Finals for the second year in a row, but lost to her former team, the Minnesota Lynx in a 3-game sweep.

On February 5, 2013, Harding signed with the Los Angeles Sparks. In her first season with the Sparks, Harding was ranked 5th in assists with a career-high 5.2 assists per game. On August 4, 2013, Harding had 11 points along with a career-high 14 assists in a regular season victory against her other former team, the Washington Mystics. Despite being an effective distributor on a talented team, the Sparks were nowhere near championship contention as they were eliminated in the first round of the playoffs. In 2015, the Sparks waived Harding after two seasons with the team.

On April 18, 2016, Harding signed with the New York Liberty. She was waived on June 15, after appearing in five games with the Liberty.

On June 24, 2016, Harding signed with the Phoenix Mercury. She was brought in to back up All-Star point guard Diana Taurasi, and coach Sandy Brondello, who worked with Harding while she was with the Sparks, felt that she fit the position. Harding appeared in 21 regular season games and then 5 playoff games while helping the Mercury advance all the way to the league semifinals. Following the team's elimination by the Minnesota Lynx, Harding announced her retirement from the WNBA after playing 9 seasons in the league.

International career

USA Basketball
She is the first Naismith winner since Kate Starbird to not have played for Team USA.

Belarus
In 2015, Harding was invited to play for the Belarus women's national basketball team, who needed more point guards. She was approved to the EuroBasket Women 2015 roster after getting a Belarusian passport, and helped the team finish the tournament in fourth. This led to Harding playing for Belarus in the 2016 FIBA World Olympic Qualifying Tournament for Women, that could get her an Olympic spot. With Harding as its leading scorer, Belarus won the fifth and final place for the 2016 Olympic tournament. Harding was listed for the Belarusian roster, though she missed part of the preparation while solving her WNBA commitments.

Overseas career
In the 2008-09 off-season, Harding played for Mersin BSB. S.K. in Turkey. In the 2009-10 off-season, Harding played in Lithuania for VICI Aistes Kaunas. In the 2012-13 off-season, Harding played in Turkey for Galatasaray. In the 2014-15 off-season, Harding played for Edirne Belediyesi in Turkey. In the 2015-16 off-season, Harding played for Dynamo Kursk in Russia for the first portion and spent the rest of the off-season playing for Yakin Dogu in Turkey. Following her retirement from the WNBA, Harding signed with Beşiktaş J.K. for the 2016-17 off-season.

South Sudan
As of 2021, Harding was the head coach of the newly-formed South Sudanese Women's national Basketball team

http://www.fiba.basketball/womensafrobasket/2021/news/lindsey-harding-ready-to-lead-south-sudan-charge/

WNBA career statistics

Regular season

|-
| align="left" | 2007
| align="left" | Minnesota
| 20 || 20 || 30.1 || .354 || .229 || .679 || 4.4 || 3.9 || 1.0 || 0.3 || 2.3 || 11.7
|-
| align="left" | 2008
| align="left" | Minnesota
| 24 || 11 || 24.6 || .367 || .080 || .694 || 2.3 || 3.2 || 1.1 || 0.1 || 2.2 || 6.4
|-
| align="left" | 2009
| align="left" | Washington
| 34 || 34 || 35.1 || .435 || .323 || .748 || 4.0 || 4.5 || 1.2 || 0.3 || 2.9 || 12.8
|-
| align="left" | 2010
| align="left" | Washington
| 34 || 34 || 33.2 || .445 || .288 || .766 || 3.0 || 4.0 || 1.3 || 0.1 || 2.7 || 12.1
|-
| align="left" | 2011
| align="left" | Atlanta
| 34 || 33 || 30.5 || .455  || .303 || .733 || 3.2 || 4.8 || 1.0 || 0.1 || 2.3 || 10.5
|-
| align="left" | 2012
| align="left" | Atlanta
| 34 || 32 || 30.6 || .425 || .241 || .818 || 2.8 || 4.5 || 1.3 || 0.2 || 2.0 || 12.3
|-
| align="left" | 2013
| align="left" | Los Angeles
| 33 || 33 || 30.6 || .441 || .182 || .759 || 2.7 || 5.2 || 1.0 || 0.3 || 2.4 || 10.9
|-
| align="left" | 2014
| align="left" | Los Angeles
| 31 || 10 || 22.7 || .333 || .227 || .786 || 1.8 || 3.2 || 1.0 || 0.0 || 1.4 || 5.7
|-
| align="left" | 2016*
| align="left" | New York
| 5 || 3 || 22.9 || .320 || .000 || 1.000 || 2.8 || 3.6 || 0.2 || 0.0 || 1.2 || 3.6
|-
| align="left" | 2016*
| align="left" | Phoenix
| 21 || 0 || 15.6 || .370 || .400 || .870 || 1.7 || 2.1 || 0.5 || 0.1 || 0.9 || 3.9
|- 
| align="left" | Career
| align="left" |9 years, 6 teams
| 270 ||210 || 28.7 || .414 || .252 || .755 || 2.9 || 4.0 || 1.1 || 0.2 || 2.2 || 9.8

Postseason

|-
| align="left" | 2009
| align="left" | Washington
| 2 || 2 || style="background:#D3D3D3"|40.5° || .385 || .000 || 1.000 || 2.5 || 4.0 || 1.5 || 0.0 || 5.0 || 10.5
|-
| align="left" | 2010
| align="left" | Washington
| 2 || 2 || 33.5 || .219 || .400 || .625 || 2.5 || 3.0 || 2.0 || 0.0 || 3.0 || 10.5
|-
| align="left" | 2011
| align="left" | Atlanta
| 8 || 8 || style="background:#D3D3D3"|37.8° || .391 || .250 || .743  || 3.0 || style="background:#D3D3D3"|5.9° || 1.8 || 0.2 || 1.6 || 14.5
|-
| align="left" | 2012
| align="left" | Atlanta
| 3 || 3 || style="background:#D3D3D3"|38.0° || .426 || .250 || .889 || 4.7 || 5.3 || 2.6 || 0.3 || 3.6 || 19.0
|-
| align="left" | 2013
| align="left" | Los Angeles
| 3 || 3 || 32.9 || .333 || .000 || .765 || 3.0 || 3.3 || 0.3 || 0.0 || 2.3 || 11.7
|-
| align="left" | 2014
| align="left" | Los Angeles
| 2 || 0 || 9.8 || .500 || .000 || .667 || 0.5 || 2.0 || 1.0 || 0.0 || 0.0 || 4.0
|-
| align="left" | 2016
| align="left" | Phoenix
| 5 || 0 || 9.1 || .462 || .000 || .000 || 0.4 || 1.4 || 0.0 || 0.2 || 1.0|| 2.4
|-
| align="left" | Career
| align="left" |7 years, 4 teams
| 25 || 18 || 29.1 || .376 || .214 || .733 || 2.4 || 3.9 || 1.3 || 0.2 || 2.1 || 10.8

References

External links

WNBA Chat Transcript
Harding gone for the season
Lynx trade Harding to the Mystics

1984 births
Living people
Belarusian women's basketball players
American women's basketball players
American emigrants to Belarus
All-American college women's basketball players
Atlanta Dream players
Basketball players at the 2016 Summer Olympics
Duke Blue Devils women's basketball players
Galatasaray S.K. (women's basketball) players
Los Angeles Sparks players
Minnesota Lynx players
New York Liberty players
Olympic basketball players of Belarus
Philadelphia 76ers scouts
Phoenix Mercury draft picks
Phoenix Mercury players
Point guards
Basketball players from Houston
Sportspeople from Mobile, Alabama
Washington Mystics players
Women's National Basketball Association first-overall draft picks